José Pellicer de Ossau y Tovar (1602-1679) was a Spanish publicist for Gaspar de Guzmán, Count-Duke of Olivares, poet, genealogist, and historian of Castile and Aragon.

Life
José Pellicer was born in Zaragoza. He published a commentary on Luis de Góngora in 1630, and his own poetry was influenced by that of Góngora. He was a chronicler of the Crown of Castile and the Crown of Aragon. He died in Madrid.

Works
 Lecciones solemnes a las obras de Don Luis de Góngora y Argote, 1630
 Anfiteatro de Felipe el Grande, 1631
 Avisos históricos, ed. Enrique Tierno Galván, 1965

References

1602 births
1679 deaths
17th-century Spanish poets
17th-century Spanish historians
Spanish genealogists
Spanish male poets
17th-century male writers